The brown-backed mockingbird (Mimus dorsalis) is a species of bird in the family Mimidae. It is found in Argentina and Bolivia.

Taxonomy and systematics

The brown-backed mockingbird is a sister species to the white-banded mockingbird (Mimus triurus). It is monotypic.

Description

The adult has a well-defined whitish supercilium, a black line through the eye, and dusky cheeks. Its crown and upperparts are chestnut brown that is brightest on the rump. The crown has darker streaks. Most of the tail is blackish but the outer three to four feathers are white. Its underside is whitish with a buff tinge to the chest, sides and flanks. The juvenile is similar with the addition of dusky spotting on its breast.

Distribution and habitat

Most of the brown-backed mockingbird's range is in western and southern Bolivia, from La Paz Department south. It also entends into northwestern Argentina as far south as Tucumán Province.

The brown-backed mockingbird inhabits arid landscapes of brush, desert shrubs, and hedgerows, often near human habitation.

Behavior

Feeding

The brown-backed mockingbird forages mostly on the ground, but details of its feeding behavior and diet have not been published.

Breeding

The brown-backed mockingbird breeds from November to March. It constructs a cup nest of twigs, often in cactus and sometimes in a bush. The clutch is four eggs. Essentially nothing else is known about its breeding phenology

Vocalization

The brown-backed mockingbird's song is "a series of repeated harsh notes and chuckles".

Status

The IUCN has assessed the brown-backed mockingbird as being of Least Concern. It is not a well-studied species, but appears to be common in suitable habitat and there are no known threats to the population.

References

brown-backed mockingbird
Birds of the Bolivian Andes
brown-backed mockingbird
Taxonomy articles created by Polbot